Joshua Emmanuel Ábrego Mortera (born November 15, 1986) is a former Mexican footballer, who last played for Dorados de Sinaloa of Liga MX.

Club career

Club Tijuana
In 2008, Joshua Ábrego started playing for Club Tijuana. In 2010, he helped Tijuana obtain the Ascenso MX Apertura 2010 championship by defeating Veracruz 3–0 on aggregate score. Then on 21 May 2011, his team won the Ascenso MX promotion final after beating Club Irapuato 2–1 on aggregate score and advanced to Liga MX. In 2012, he obtained the Apertura 2012 championship of Liga MX after defeating Toluca 4–1 on aggregate score.

Dorados
On May 23, 2015, Dorados was promoted to the Liga MX after defeating Necaxa 3–1 on aggregate score.

Honours

Club
Tijuana
Campeón de Ascenso: 2011
Liga MX Apertura 2012

References

1986 births
Living people
Footballers from Veracruz
Association football defenders
Club Tijuana footballers
Dorados de Sinaloa footballers
Liga MX players
Mexican footballers